George Howard may refer to:

Music
 George Howard (jazz) (1956–1998), American smooth jazz saxophonist
 George S. Howard (1902–1995),  American colonel and conductor of United States Air Force Band

Politics
 George Howard (Governor of Maryland) (1789–1846), governor of Maryland, 1831–1833
 Sir George Howard (courtier) (c.1525–1580), MP for Devizes, Rochester, Winchelsea, Newton and Reigate
 George Howard (died 1671) (1622–1671), English politician who sat in the House of Commons between 1660 and 1671
 George Howard, 4th Earl of Suffolk (1624–1691)
 George Howard, 6th Earl of Carlisle (1773–1848), English statesman
 George Howard, 7th Earl of Carlisle (1802–1864), British politician and statesman
 George Howard, 9th Earl of Carlisle (1843–1911), English aristocrat, politician and painter
 George Howard, 11th Earl of Carlisle (1895–1963), British peer
 George Howard, 13th Earl of Carlisle (born 1949), English hereditary peer
 George Howard, Baron Howard of Henderskelfe (1920–1984), British life peer

Sports
 George Howard (rugby league), rugby league footballer of the 1940s and 1950s
 George Howard (footballer) (born 1996), association footballer for Melbourne Victory

Other
 George Howard (British Army officer) (1718–1796), British military officer and field marshal
 George C. Howard (1818–1887), Nova Scotian-born American actor and showman
 George W. Howard (1848–?), American railway worker and union leader
 George Elliott Howard (1849–1928), American professor of history
 George Howard (Hebraist), American professor of Jewish Studies
 George Bronson Howard (1884–1922), American reporter and fiction writer
 George Wren Howard (1893–1968), British publisher
 George Howard Jr. (1924–2007), American federal judge